Irvin Valentine Abernathy (August 23, 1852 – February 4, 1925) was a Democratic member of the Mississippi House of Representatives, representing Chickasaw County, from 1916 until his death.

Biography 
Irvin Valentine Abernathy was born on August 23, 1852, in Troy, Mississippi. His parents were Marion Abernathy and Martha (Wilson) Abernathy. He married Mary Jane Laughlin in 1882. Before becoming a member of the Mississippi House of Representatives, he was a member of the Board of Supervisors of Chickasaw County, and was a public cotton weigher for 10 years. He was elected to the Mississippi House of Representatives, representing Chickasaw County as a Democrat, in November 1915, for the 1916–1920 term. He was re-elected in November 1919. He was re-elected once more in November 1923. However, he died before finishing his term, on February 4, 1925, in Chickasaw County, Mississippi. He was buried in the IOOF cemetery there.

References 

1852 births
1925 deaths
Democratic Party members of the Mississippi House of Representatives
People from Chickasaw County, Mississippi